November 3 - Eastern Orthodox liturgical calendar - November 5

All fixed commemorations below celebrated on November 17 by Eastern Orthodox Churches on the Old Calendar.

For November 4th, Orthodox Churches on the Old Calendar commemorate the Saints listed on October 22.

Saints
 Saint Abimelech of Gerar the Righteous, who hosted Abraham, who had presented his wife Sarah as his sister (Genesis 20).
 Apostles Hermas, Patrobas, Linus, Gaius and Philologus, of the Seventy (1st century)  (see also: November 5)
 Hierymartyrs Nicander, Bishop of Myra, and Hermas, presbyter, both disciples of Titus (1st century)
 Martyr Porphyrius the Mime, of Caesarea (361)
 Saint Sylvia, mother of St. Gregory the Dialogist (6th century)  (see also: November 3)
 Venerable Joannicius the Great of Bithynia (834)

Pre-Schism Western saints
 Saints Vitalis and Agricola, martyrs in Bologna in Italy, under Diocletian (c. 304)
 Saint Modesta, niece of St Modoald in France and first Abbess of Oehren in Trier in Germany (680)
 Saint Proculus, Bishop of Autun in France martyred by invading Huns (c. 717)
 Saint Clarus, a hermit near Rouen, murdered in the village of Saint-Clair-sur-Epte (c. 875)
 Saint Birnstan of Winchester(Beornstan), Bishop of Winchester in England, who loved to pray for the departed (c. 934)
 Saint Gregory of Burtscheid, a Greek monk from Cerchiara in Calabria in Italy, founder of Burtscheid Abbey (999)  (see also: November 5)
 Saint Emeric of Hungary, son of St Stephen, the first Christian King of Hungary, he was a disciple of St Gerard Sagredo of Czanad, Confessor (1031)

Post-Schism Orthodox saints
 Saint Luke, Bishop of Novgorod (1059)
 Holy and Righteous Ioane, Stepane, and Isaiah the Georgians.
 Saint John III Doukas Vatatzes the Merciful, Emperor of Nicaea (1254)
 Venerable Mercurius the Faster, of the Far Caves in Kiev (14th century)  (see also: November 24)
 Blessed Simon of Yurievets and Zharki, Fool-for-Christ (1584)
 Saint Nicander, founder of Gorodnoezersk Monastery (Novgorod) (1603)
 Saint Paul (Konyuskevych), Metropolitan of Tobolsk and Siberia (1768)
 Venerable George (Karslidis) of Drama the Confessor (1959)  (see also: October 24 / November 6 - Russian)

New martyrs and confessors
 New Hieromartyr Nicholas Vinogradov, Confessor and Priest (1931)
 Virgin-martyr Eugenia (Lysova), nun (1935)
 New Hieromartyr Alexander Petropavlovsky, Priest (1937)
 New Hieromartyr Ismael Bazilevsky, Priest (1941)

Other commemorations
 Narration of the destruction of Jerusalem (587 BC) in the Lamentations of Jeremiah the Prophet, and on the ecstasy of Abimelech (= Ebedmelech the Ethiopian, of Jeremiah 38:7).
 Repose of Schemamonk Mark of Sarov Monastery (1817)

Icon gallery

Notes

References

Sources
 November 4/November 17. Orthodox Calendar (PRAVOSLAVIE.RU).
 November 17 / November 4. HOLY TRINITY RUSSIAN ORTHODOX CHURCH (A parish of the Patriarchate of Moscow).
 November 4. OCA - The Lives of the Saints.
 The Autonomous Orthodox Metropolia of Western Europe and the Americas (ROCOR). St. Hilarion Calendar of Saints for the year of our Lord 2004. St. Hilarion Press (Austin, TX). pp. 82–83.
 The Fourth Day of the Month of November. Orthodoxy in China.
 November 4. Latin Saints of the Orthodox Patriarchate of Rome.
 The Roman Martyrology. Transl. by the Archbishop of Baltimore. Last Edition, According to the Copy Printed at Rome in 1914. Revised Edition, with the Imprimatur of His Eminence Cardinal Gibbons. Baltimore: John Murphy Company, 1916. p. 340-341.
 Rev. Richard Stanton. A Menology of England and Wales, or, Brief Memorials of the Ancient British and English Saints Arranged According to the Calendar, Together with the Martyrs of the 16th and 17th Centuries. London: Burns & Oates, 1892. pp. 524–526.

 Greek Sources
 Great Synaxaristes:  4 ΝΟΕΜΒΡΙΟΥ. ΜΕΓΑΣ ΣΥΝΑΞΑΡΙΣΤΗΣ.
  Συναξαριστής. 4 Νοεμβρίου. ECCLESIA.GR. (H ΕΚΚΛΗΣΙΑ ΤΗΣ ΕΛΛΑΔΟΣ).
  04/11/2015. Ορθόδοξος Συναξαριστής.

 Russian Sources
  17 ноября (4 ноября). Православная Энциклопедия под редакцией Патриарха Московского и всея Руси Кирилла (электронная версия). (Orthodox Encyclopedia - Pravenc.ru).
  4 ноября по старому стилю  /  17 ноября по новому стилю. Русская Православная Церковь - Православный церковный календарь на 2015 год.

November in the Eastern Orthodox calendar